() or Route 25 is a national road in the Southern Region of Iceland. It runs from Route 1 near Hella, crosses through Þykkvibær and ends at Suður Nýibær.

References

Roads in Iceland